The Sula pitta (Erythropitta dohertyi) is a species of the pitta. It was considered a subspecies of the red-bellied pitta.  It is endemic to Indonesia where it occurs in the Sula and Banggai Islands.  Its natural habitat is subtropical or tropical moist lowland forests. It is threatened by habitat loss.

References

Sula pitta
Birds of the Sula Islands
Sula pitta
Taxonomy articles created by Polbot